Thalassobius testaceus is a species of beetle in the family Carabidae, the only species in the genus Thalassobius.

References

Trechinae